The 1921 Earlham Quakers football team represented Earlham College as an independent during the 1921 college football season. Led by third-year head coach Ray Mowe, the Quakers compiled a record of 2–4–1.

Schedule

References

Earlham
Earlham Quakers football seasons
Earlham Quakers football